The 2016 Florida A&M Rattlers football team represented Florida A&M University in the 2016 NCAA Division I FCS football season. The Rattlers were led by second-year head coach Alex Wood. They played their home games at Bragg Memorial Stadium. They were a member of the Mid-Eastern Athletic Conference (MEAC). They finished the season 4–7, 4–4 in MEAC play to finish in a two way tie for fifth place.

Schedule

 Source: Schedule

Game summaries

@ Miami (Fla.)

@ Coastal Carolina

vs Tuskegee

South Carolina State

Savannah State

North Carolina Central

@ Delaware State

Hampton

@ North Carolina A&T

Morgan State

vs Bethune-Cookman

References

Florida AandM
Florida A&M Rattlers football seasons